The Piauí gubernatorial election was be held on 5 October 2014 to elect the next governor of the state of Piauí.  Governor Moraes Souza Filho ran for his first full term after becoming governor in 2014, but was resoundingly defeated by Senator Wellington Dias of the PT in the first round.

Candidates

Opinion Polling

Results

References

2014 Brazilian gubernatorial elections
Piauí gubernatorial elections
October 2014 events in South America